The International Society for Biocuration (ISB)  is a non-profit organisation that promotes the field of biocuration and was founded in early 2009. It provides a forum for information exchange through meetings and workshops. The society's conference, the International Biocuration Conference, has been held in Pacific Grove, California (2005), San José, CA (2007), Berlin (2009), Tokyo, Japan (2010), Washington, DC (2012), Cambridge, UK (2013), Toronto, Canada (2014), Beijing, China (2015) and Geneva, Switzerland (2016). The meeting in 2017 will be held in Stanford, California.

Database is the official journal of the society and it has published the proceedings of the societies conferences since 2009.

Aims of the society

The aims of the society include:
 promoting interactions among biocurators
 fostering the professional development of biocurators
 promoting best practices
 ensuring interoperability
 creating and maintaining standards 
 promoting relationships with journal publishers.

Executive Committee (EC)

The Executive Committee (EC) is composed of nine (9) elected members, each with a 3 year term. EC members can serve a maximum of two terms. Within the EC, there are positions for Chair, Secretary and Treasurer that are in charge of leading the EC and by extension the membership. Elections for the EC are held on an annual basis. The EC promotes the ISB’s activity to members and non-members, and contributes to the decisions that are taken on behalf of the biocuration community. Additional activities include reviewing microgrant submissions, assisting with organization of the annual Biocuration conference, preparing materials for the ISB election, and maintaining the website.

Biocuration Career Award
The Biocuration Career Award is an award given by the International Society for Biocuration for outstanding contributions for the field of biocuration.

See also
 Biocuration
 Digital curation
 Metadata
 Ontology

References

External references

Computational biology
Biology societies
Bioinformatics organizations